Bullies is a 1986 Canadian action-drama film about a feud between two families in a small town in a similar vein to the remake of Romeo and Juliet (1968). The film was directed by Paul Lynch, and stars Jonathan Crombie, Janet-Laine Green, Stephen Hunter, and Olivia d'Abo.

Cast

Reception
Bullies opened at the box office at No. 13 with $1,532,605, and ended at $2,995,527.

References

External links
 
 
 
 

1986 films
Canadian action drama films
Canadian action thriller films
English-language Canadian films
1980s action thriller films
1980s action drama films
Universal Pictures films
Bullying in fiction
Films scored by Paul Zaza
Films based on Romeo and Juliet
Films directed by Paul Lynch
1986 drama films
1980s English-language films
1980s Canadian films